Love, Guaranteed is a 2020 American romantic comedy film directed by Mark Steven Johnson and written by Elizabeth Hackett and Hilary Galanoy, starring Rachael Leigh Cook and Damon Wayans Jr. It was released on Netflix on September 3, 2020.

Plot 
In Seattle, Susan is a mostly pro bono lawyer for Whitaker Associates who goes undercover to investigate the online dating website Love, Guaranteed. Her client Nick has had 986 dates through them with no luck finding love. The three dates she tries go decidedly wrong, and she also goes to secretly observe his 1000th date to make sure he's on the up and up.

Susan and Nick attend a meeting with founder Tamara Taylor and her lawyers, who offer $100,000 to settle out of court, which they decline in lieu of a court date six weeks later. In preparation for their court appearance, Susan and Nick meet up to discuss their case, etc. and they start to show a mutual interest. One of the other lawyers, after seeing some photos of them taken by a private investigator, call Susan to advise her that a developing relationship with Nick could be considered nullifying their argument, as their meeting was due to Love, Guaranteed.

So, Susan chooses to spend the last two weeks before the court date avoiding him, to try to turn off their feelings. The day arrives, and Susan seems to be winning the case, cleverly managing to question the defense's prime witness, Nick's ex-fiancée and supermodel, Arianna, before the defense. However, in the five-minute recess, Nick goes after Arianna to thank her, and she makes him realize that he loves Susan.

Nick returns to the courtroom, withdrawing his lawsuit on the grounds that he has fallen in love with his lawyer, who admits that she loves him too. Then they kiss passionately and make their relationship official. At the very end, Tamara Taylor offers to give them the money Nick asks for to open a pro bono physical therapy clinic in exchange for Susan and Nick being the image for Love, Guaranteed.

Cast

 Rachael Leigh Cook as Susan Whitaker, a struggling attorney
 Damon Wayans Jr. as Nick Evans, Susan's well-heeled client
 Caitlin Howden as Melanie, Susan's sister
 Jed Rees as Bill Jones
 Lisa Durupt as Denise, Susan's legal assistant
 Sean Amsing as Roberto, Susan's other legal assistant
 Brendan Taylor as Gideon, Melanie's husband and Susan's brother-in-law
 Alvin Sanders as Jerome
 Kandyse McClure as Arianna, Nick's ex-fiancée from two years ago
 Heather Graham as Tamara Taylor, the CEO of a dating site known as Love, Guaranteed
 Quynh Mi as Rita Wu, the date who talked about cats all night
 Kallie Hu as Micah
 Milo Shandel as Dr. Rossmore
 Sebastian Billingsley-Rodriguez as Oliver
 Jason Burkart as Sparkletts Guy
 Claire Hesselgrave as Pam

Production
The film, set in Seattle, was shot in Vancouver, British Columbia, Canada. Locations used include the Gastown neighborhood, the Vancouver Art Gallery, and Stanley Park.

Rachael Leigh Cook produced and stars in the film. The idea came from the real-life lawsuit brought against Molson Coors who claimed in their advertising that their beer was brewed using "pure Rocky Mountain spring water." The lawsuit brought by Rachel Leigh Cook's character and her client in the film revolves around the unrealistic promises made by an online dating service.

The film's original score was composed by Ryan Shore.

Reception
On Metacritic, the film has a weighted average score of 39 out of 100, based on 6 critics, indicating "generally unfavorable reviews".

Lisa Kennedy of Variety wrote: "If likability is a trait you value, Love, Guaranteed delivers the undemanding pleasure of watching two fundamentally decent people tumble into fondness and then love."

References

External links
 
 

2020 films
2020 independent films
2020 romantic comedy films
American legal films
American independent films
American romantic comedy films
English-language Netflix original films
Films about online dating
Films directed by Mark Steven Johnson
Films set in Seattle
Films shot in Vancouver
Films scored by Ryan Shore
Films about interracial romance
2020s English-language films
2020s American films